The Old Grand Rapids Christian High School is a former private school building located at 415 Franklin Street SE in Grand Rapids, Michigan. The building was the original site of Grand Rapids Christian High School, which constructed the building in 1920. It was listed on the National Register of Historic Places in 2018. As of 2019, the building is being rehabilitated as a community and religious center known as 415 Franklin.

History
The site where this building now stands was the original home, in the 1890s, of Calvin Seminary and its Junior College, the Holland Theology School. In 1920, the Grand Rapids Christian High School was established and purchased the property, constructing a new building for their high school. The school opened with 260 students, which increased to over 1000 students in 1950. In 1964, the continued growth led the school to divide into two campuses; however, the increase was not sustainable, and the schools recombined in 1972. Needing only one building, Grand Rapids Christian High sold the 415 Franklin campus to Kent County. The Kent County Department of Social Services used the building until 2009, at which time it was sold to local developer Ed DeVries (also a Grand Rapids Central Christian alumnus). Soon after, Madison Church:Ford Campus began discussions about using the chapel within the building. In 2015, DeVries Companies gave the building to Madison Church. The church is partnering with the Inner City Christian Federation and the Refugee Education Center to rehabilitate the school building into a community and church space, as well as providing housing on the upper floors.

References

External links
415 Franklin

		
National Register of Historic Places in Kent County, Michigan
School buildings completed in 1920
1920 establishments in Michigan